Theopropus is an Asian genus of praying mantids in the family Hymenopodidae: subfamily Hymenopodinae and tribe Hymenopodini.

Species
The Mantodea Species File includes:
 Theopropus borneensis
 Theopropus cattulus
 Theopropus elegans - type species
 Theopropus rubrobrunneus

References

External links
Pictures on Up Close with Nature blog
 
 

Mantodea genera
Insects of Southeast Asia